The 2011 Liberty Flames football team represented Liberty University in the 2011 NCAA Division I FCS football season. The Flames were led by sixth-year head coach Danny Rocco and played their home games at Williams Stadium. They were a member of the Big South Conference. They finished the season 7–4, 5–1 in Big South play to finish in second place.

Schedule

References

Liberty
Liberty Flames football seasons
Liberty Flames football